The Danish women's football champions (plural: Danske mestre i kvindefodbold) are the annual winners of the highest national league that is part of the Danmarksturneringen i kvindefodbold (Kvinde-DM), the nationwide women's association football league tournament in Denmark. Since February 1972, women's football in Denmark has been governed by the Danish Football Association (DBU), sanctioned by UEFA, with the national title being contested in varying forms of competitions. The first official national women's football tournament was held in the 1973-season, where the winners of the regional leagues progressed to a knockout tournament, with the play-off winners being crowned champions. A nation league system was established in 1975 with the formation of a west and east division, where the best team at the top of each group qualified for a spot in the grand final. A single nation-wide first division was introduced in 1981 and the championship was now awarded to the team at the top of the league by the end of the season. Since the 2016–17 season, the winners have been found through the rebranded Kvindeligaen.

Brøndby IF Women are the most successful team with twelve titles. Hjortshøj-Egaa IF had the longest winning streak with six league championships in a row (1986–1992) until Brøndby IF matched it by winning all seasons between 2002–03 and 2007–08. Brøndby IF has claimed the Danish version of the double the most times, by winning the league and the cup in the same year a total of eight times, four more occasions than Fortuna Hjørring's four. The defending champions are HB Køge, who won the 2020–21 title for the first time in the club's history. Lis Westberg Pedersen became the first women's head coach in 1980, winning the 8th edition of the championship with BK Femina in her first season. Henriette Jensen of Hjortshøj-Egaa IF became the first woman to win a championship title as both a football player and head coach in 1990. With four national championships each, Peer Lisdorf (3x Brøndby IF, 1x HB Køge) and Peer Danefeld (2x B 1909, 1x Odense BK, 1x Brøndby IF) have won the most titles as head coach.

The weekly magazine Femina, regional organizations, various clubs, and Dansk Kvinde Fodbold Union (DKFU) held national indoor and outdoor football tournaments for women's teams throughout the 1960s, with the last competitions lasting up until early 1972. Neither the Danish FA (DBU) nor the National Olympic Committee and Sports Confederation of Denmark (DIF) recognize any women's national championship tournaments held before February 1972. These indoor and outdoor senior women's records are hence not listed here.

History

Inaugural championship playoffs
The weekly magazine Femina organized Denmark's first outdoor association football tournament for women's teams in the spring of 1960, which featured thirty teams from across the country, playing under a modified set of laws created and revised by the magazine. Due to the larger number of expected participants, the original tournament format of an initial group stage followed by a knockout phase was changed to become a knockout football competition with an initial qualifying phase of three rounds and a championship play-off consisting of four teams, which was played on 17 July 1960 at Valby Idrætspark. BK Femina won the final against a team from Køge by a score of 4–1. Additional indoor and outdoor football tournaments were held in the followings years, but women's football experienced a decreasing interest in the mid-1960s before a small and slow growth of new teams, primarily affiliated to firms, occurred in the late 1960s, not warranting for a league to be formed — until 1970 the number of clubs with women's football teams did not exceed ten. BK Femina were the leading Danish women's team of the era, winning more or less every indoor and outdoor championship organized by the Dansk Kvinde Fodbold Union (DKFU). In the spring of 1971, the DKFU organized one last national outdoor football tournament with over 200 teams, where Skovlunde IF faced Billum IF in the championship final, securing a 3–0 victory.

Encouraged by both FIFA and UEFA, a successful vote at the meeting of the Board of Representatives of the Danish Football Association (DBU) on 27 February 1972 meant that women's football would now officially be acknowledged and competitions coordinated under the auspices of the national association. The first year was considered an adaptation year in which the regional football associations were to set up various committees to plan the tournaments. The qualifying regional tournaments could not meet the deadline of 1 November for having the regional champions ready for the national playoffs, and the national championship was not concluded in 1972.

The first official Danish women's national football championship was held the following year as a single-elimination tournament, where the winners of the six regional football association's top-flight leagues, namely Nexø BK (Bornholm FA champions), BK Rødovre (Copenhagen FA champions), BK Stjernen Svendborg (Funen FA champions), Ribe BK&GF (Jutland FA champions), B 1921 (Lolland-Falster FA champions) and Skovlunde IF (Zealand FA champions) faced each other for a spot in the inaugural one-legged championship final. Ribe BK&GF became the inaugural winners in the 1973-season by winning 1–0 against BK Stjernen Svendborg in the final competed at Høje Bøge Stadium, Svendborg. Besides the championship trophy received from the Danish FA, additional championship plaques from the National Olympic Committee and Sports Confederation of Denmark (DIF) were handed to each participant. This initial format lasted for another season (1974) with a repeat of the same finalists and winners. Regional qualifiers were implemented to decide, which twenty teams would take part in the new installation of the 1975 championship format.

Formation of the Danmarksturneringen

A nation league system with the Danmarksturneringen i damefodbold at the top was incepted in 1975, consisting of a nationwide first division evenly divided geographically into two groups, clubs situated east and west of the Great Belt, establishing a promotion and relegation system with the regional top-flight leagues. The two winners of each group at the end of the regular season qualified for a spot in the two-legged championship final. The winners of the third edition were BK Femina, the then oldest existing pure women's association football club, who entered the final match by finishing at the top of the east group. BK Femina defeated Ribe BK&GF 1–0 away at Ribe Stadium and 4–0 at home at Gladsaxe Idrætspark. For six seasons (1973–1980), BK Femina was a regular at each final, securing the national title on three occasions, while Ribe BK&GF won three other championship finals. For economic reasons, the Danish FA wanted to postpone the implementation of a single nation-wide top-flight league, because the traveling expenses would double. After winning their fifth championship in 1979, the tournament rules declared that Ribe BK&GF could keep the original trophy permanently. In a profession dominated by male coaches, Lis Westberg Pedersen became the female head coach to manage a top-flight league team, guiding BK Femina to a championship title in the 1980-season.

In 1981, the first single national women's tier-one league, named Dame 1. division, began to play using a double round-robin system with no playoffs, where the top team at the end of the season determined the annual national champions of Danish women's football. B 1909 won the ninth edition as the first team based at Funen, with five points more than BK Femina. Throughout the 1980s and early 1990s, the women's football championship was dominated by Hjortshøj-Egaa IF and B 1909, who shared the national titles (1981–1993) of which Hjortshøj-Egaa IF managed a run of six consecutive championships between 1986 and 1991. The format changed to a two-staged season in the 1990-season, hence predating the two-stage format introduced to the Danish Superliga in the 1991–92 season. Teams played a single round-robin tournament in the first stage after which points were given based on positions and goal scores were reset to zero, with the top six placed and bottom six placed teams playing another single round-robin for a total of 21 games determining the champions and relegated clubs respectively. Henriette Jensen became the first woman to win the championship title as a football player (defender) and as a head coach, having already won five league titles (1982, 1984, 1986, 1987, and 1988) and one title as an assistant coach (1989) with the top-flight club Hjortshøj-Egaa IF, when she in January 1990 shifted to a coaching position together with Ove Sass Hansen, securing the league title in her first and second year.

In 1993 a nationwide second division was formed, with the existing top-flight league being rebranded Elitedivisionen, the number of teams was reduced from twelve to eight and the two-stage format had its first of several revisions. The first double was claimed by Fortuna Hjørring by winning the 1994–95 cup and 1995 league. The 1996-season lasted just six months when the tournament schedule was changed from spring-fall to fall-spring. Initially formed as an amateur tournament, professionalism was legalized and restricted to the Danmarksturneringen in July 1997, with the first semi-professional player contracts in Danish women's football being signed by Fortuna Hjørring and Frederiksberg BK. The first season (1997–98) as a semi-professional top-flight league was won by Hjortshøj-Egaa IF, whose roster consisted solely of players with amateur status. Fortuna Hjørring secured the 1998–99 title as the first semi-professional club. Two seasons around the turn of the millennium were won by Odense BK in close competition with Hjortshøj-Egaa IF and Fortuna Hjørring, who finished in the top three for ten seasons.

The seasons between 2001 and 2020 featured an uninterrupted power duopoly in Danish women's football between Fortuna Hjørring and Brøndby IF, resulting in twelve league titles and runners-up seven times for Brøndby IF and the opposite for Fortuna Hjørring, including six consecutive championships to Brøndby IF from 2002 to 2008. HB Køge broke the nineteen-year dominance in the 2020–21 season by securing the championship in the last round of play in their first season at the highest level, just three and a half years after experiencing continuous promotion from the fifth level. The present challenge trophy and the eighth design in history for the women's championship made its debut in the 2013–14 season after the previous trophy became the permanent property of Brøndby IF following three consecutive championships (2010–2013). Ahead of the 2016–17 season, the top-flight league formally changed its name to Kvindeligaen.

Champions

Danmarksmesterskabet i damefodbold playoffs (1972–1974)

Danmarksturneringen i damefodbold playoffs (1975–1980)

Dame 1. division (1981–1992)

Elitedivisionen (1993–2016)

Kvindeligaen (2016–present)

Performances
Eight clubs have won the Danish national title. Among these, more than half of the championships have gone to Jutlandic clubs, one-third of teams within Zealand, and one-sixth to Funen-based squads – no teams from the regional football associations of DBU Copenhagen, DBU Lolland-Falster, and DBU Bornholm have finished in the top-two. BK Rødovre have managed to reach third place on five occasions and qualified for the championship playoffs in the two first editions, B 1921 finished in 8th place in the 2002–03 season, while Svaneke BK ended the 1980 season in 7th place (east group).

Since the 2002–03 season, the Danish FA have officially allowed clubs to wear a symbolic five-pointed gold star, designed by the national association, on their jersey above the club's logo for every fifth championship that the club has won. Fortuna Hjørring added a star above the previous wordmark logo on their shirts shortly thereafter. When Fortuna Hjørring introduced a new logo design in March/April 2008, a yellow star became an integral part of the new design. When the club won their 10th title in 2018, a second star was added to the logo design. Brøndby IF Women made use of that option for the first time during the 2011–12 season by including a single yellow star on the jersey designs, and a second star was added in 2015.

Performance by club
{| class="wikitable sortable"
|-
!Rank!!Club!!Champions!!!!Winning seasons
|-
|align="center"|1
|Brøndby IF
|align="center"|12
|align="center"|8
|2002–03, 2003–04, 2004–05, 2005–06, 2006–07, 2007–08, 2010–11, 2011–12, 2012–13, 2014–15, 2016–17, 2018–19
|-
|align="center"|2
|Fortuna Hjørring
|align="center"|11
|align="center"|22
|1994, 1995, 1996, 1998–99, 2001–02, 2008–09, 2009–10, 2013–14, 2015–16, 2017–18, 2019–20
|-
|align="center"|3
|Hjortshøj-Egaa IF{{efn|name=hei-iks|In January 2002 – halfway through the 2001–02 season – Hjortshøj-Egaa IF's two elite women's squads, playing in the national and regional top-flight leagues, merged with IK Skovbakken's women's youth department for economic reasons, transferring the league licenses from Hjortshøj-Egaa IF to IK Skovbakken Kvindefodbold.}}
|align="center"|10
|align="center"|6
|1982, 1984, 1986, 1987, 1988, 1989, 1990, 1991, 1996–97, 1997–98
|-
|align="center"|4
|B 1909
|align="center"|5
|align="center"|5
|1981, 1983, 1985, 1992, 1993
|-
|align="center"|5
|Ribe BK{{efn|name=ribebk|Ribe BK&GF changed their name to Ribe BK in October 1993 due to Nørremarkens BK being merged into the club.}}
|align="center"|5
|align="center"|1
|1973, 1974, 1976, 1978, 1979
|-
|align="center"|6
|BK Femina
|align="center"|3
|align="center"|4
|1975, 1977, 1980
|-
|align="center"|7
|Odense Q{{efn|name=odenseq|In March 2016, the women's elite department, OB Kvinde Elite, was refounded as a separate association football club named Odense Q, assuming the league license of Odense BK beginning from the 2016–17 season.}}
|align="center"|2
|align="center"|0
|1999–2000, 2000–01
|-
|align="center"|8
|HB Køge
|align="center"|2
|align="center"|0
|2020–21, 2021–22
|-
|align="center"|—
|BK Stjernen Svendborg
|align="center"|0
|align="center"|2
| 
|-
|align="center"|—
|Kolding BK
|align="center"|0
|align="center"|1
| 
|}

Performance by regional association

Footnotes

References

Denmark Women
Danish Women's Football League